The 2006–07 season was Futebol Clube do Porto's 96th competitive season, 73rd consecutive season in the top flight of Portuguese football, and 113th year in existence as a football club.

Porto's victory in the 2005–06 Primeira Liga, qualified them for the 2006 Supertaça Cândido de Oliveira and the 2006–07 UEFA Champions League group stage. Porto won their first piece of silverware of the season by winning the Supertaça Cândido de Oliveira against Vitória de Setúbal. Jesualdo Ferreira would be appointed as manager shortly afterwards, after Rui Barros had been appointed caretaker manager after Dutch coach Co Adriaanse left the club in August.

The Dragões would progress through the Champions League group stage by finishing second in their group behind Arsenal. The Portistas would be eliminated in the following round, the first knockout round, by English side Chelsea who were led at the time by former Porto coach José Mourinho. Porto were defeated 3–2 on aggregate over two legs.

In the last game of the league season, the Azuis e Brancos would claim a twenty-second league title after a 4–1 home victory over Desportivo das Aves.

Key events

July

 10: Portuguese center forward Hugo Almeida joins Bundesliga side Werder Bremen on a seasons long loan.
 13: Porto announce the signings of Moroccan winger Tarik Sektioui and Brazilian full back Ezequias.
 22: Porto draw 2–2 with Dutch side Groningen in a pre-season game held in the Netherlands.
 27: A Bruno Moraes goal grants Porto victory over Dutch side Heracles Almelo in a pre-season friendly game.
 28: Premier League side Blackburn Rovers announce the signing of South African striker Benni McCarthy for €3.7 million.
 30: In Porto's official presentation to its members of their 2006–07 squad, the Dragões defeat Italian side Roma, 1–0.

August
 9: Porto announce Co Adriaanse's resignation as manager, with assistant coach Rui Barros being appointed as caretaker coach.
 18: The Portistas confirm the appointment of Jesualdo Ferreira as manager, with immediate effect.
 19: Porto claim a fifteenth Supertaça Cândido de Oliveira, after defeating Vitória de Setúbal 3–0, thanks to second half goals from Adriano, Anderson and Vieirinha.
 24: Porto draws Arsenal, CSKA Moscow and Hamburg in the Champions League draw.
 25: Porto win their first league game of the season, by claiming a 2–1 home win over União de Leiria at the Estádio do Dragão. Adriano and Ricardo Quaresma scored Porto's goals.
 31: On the last day of the transfer window, Porto sign Uruguayan full back Jorge Fucile from Liverpool de Montevideo. The arrival of Fucile sees the departure of César Peixoto to Spanish side RCD Espanyol on a seasons long loan.

September
 10: Porto win their second league game of the season, after defeating Estrela da Amadora 3–0. The match took place at Benfica's Estádio da Luz due to Estrela's home ground Estádio José Gomes being under renovation.
 13: Porto draws their opening game of the UEFA Champions League group stage. The Portistas earned a point following a goalless match with Russian side CSKA Moscow.
 17: A Mário Sérgio own goal and first half strike from left back Marek Čech gives Porto a 2–0 away win over Naval 1º de Maio.
 22: Goals from Hélder Postiga, Lisandro López and Tarik Sektioui sees Porto secure their fourth consecutive win in the league over Beira-Mar.
 26: Porto suffer their first loss of the season after they lose 2–0 to English side Arsenal in their second UEFA Champions League group stage match. Thierry Henry and Alexander Hleb scored Arsenal's goals which granted the Gunners with three points.

October
 2: Jesualdo Ferreira's side suffer their first loss of the league season, by losing 2–1 to Braga at the Estádio Municipal de Braga.
 17: Goals from Lisandro López, Lucho González and Hélder Postiga gives Porto their first Champions League win of the campaign as the Dragões defeat German side Hamburger SV at the Estádio do Dragão.
 22: In the first Clássico game of the season, a second-half Ricardo Quaresma goal grants Porto a draw against Sporting CP after Yannick Djaló had scored for the home side.
 28: A late headed goal from Brazilian striker Bruno Moraes gives the Azuis e Brancos a 3–2 home win over rivals Benfica in Porto's second Clássico game in the space of six days.

November
 1: Porto earn a second consecutive Champions League group stage win after a 3–1 away win at Hamburg's Volksparkstadion. A first half wonder strike from Lucho González, and second half goals from Lisandro López and Bruno Moraes gave Porto the three points.
 21: Porto obtain a third consecutive group stage win by defeating CSKA Moscow 2–0 at the Lokomotiv Stadium. Ricardo Quaresma and Lucho González scored Porto's goals.
 28: Porto draws third division side Atlético CP in the fourth round of the Taça de Portugal.

December
 6: Porto draw 0–0 at home with Arsenal in the last game of the Champions League group stage, and miss out on claiming first place in Group H.  The Portistas would finish the group stage campaign with eleven points.
 15: Porto draws English side Chelsea in the UEFA Champions League first knockout round.
 22: Porto sign Argentinean full back Lucas Mareque on a three-year contract from River Plate for €1 million.

January

 25: Porto sign Colombian striker Wason Rentería from Brazilian side Internacional on an undisclosed fee.
 26: A 17th-minute goal from União de Leiria's Damien Tixier inflicts on Porto a second league loss of the season.

February
 21: The Azuis e Brancos tie their first leg round of 16 tie against José Mourinho's Chelsea. Porto opened the scoring through Raul Meireles on twelve minutes, but their lead was cancelled out four minutes later through Ukrainian striker Andriy Shevchenko.

March
 6: Despite an early Quaresma goal in the second leg of Porto's Champions League tie at Stamford Bridge, Ferreira's side would bow out of the competition after second half goals from Dutch winger Arjen Robben and German midfielder Michael Ballack which provided the Blues with safe passage to the quarter-finals.
 11: Porto release Croatian striker Tomo Šokota after two seasons at the club.

April

May
 20: A 4–1 home win over Desportivo das Aves in the last game of the league season, sees the Dragões win a 22nd Primeira Liga title.

Squads

First team squad
Stats as of the end of the 2006–07 season. Games played and goals scored only refers to appearances and goals in the Primeira Liga.

Pre-season and friendlies

Legend

Matches

Competitions

Legend

Overall

Competition record

Supertaça Cândido de Oliveira

Primeira Liga

League table

Results summary

Results by round

Matches

Taça de Portugal

UEFA Champions League

Group stage

First knockout round

Statistics

Appearances and goals
As of the end of the 2006–07 season.

|-
! colspan="15" style="background:#dcdcdc; text-align:center;"| Goalkeepers

|-
! colspan="15" style="background:#dcdcdc; text-align:center;"| Defenders

|-
! colspan="15" style="background:#dcdcdc; text-align:center;"| Midfielders

|-
! colspan="15" style="background:#dcdcdc; text-align:center;"| Forwards

|}

Clean sheets
As of the end of the 2006–07 season.

Disciplinary record
As of the end of the 2006–07 season.

Overview
As of the end of the 2006–07 season.

References

FC Porto seasons
Porto
Portuguese football championship-winning seasons